Morace is an Italian surname. Notable people with the surname include:

 Alessandro Morace, Italian child actor
 Carolina Morace (born 1964), former Italian football player
 Robert Morace (born 1947), American writer

See also
 Moraceae, family of flowering plants

Italian-language surnames